House of Councillors elections were held in Japan on 29 July 2001. They were the first national elections since Junichiro Koizumi became Prime Minister after Yoshiro Mori resigned in April 2001. The Liberal Democratic Party (LDP) and its election allies, were the major winner, provided Koizumi a strong mandates to move forward with his reform policies. The ruling coalition performed well, and regain their majority in the House of Councillors.

Background
The electoral reform enacted in 2000 became effective for the first time. The number of Councillors per election was reduced by five, by two in the nationwide proportional representation and by one each in Okayama, Kumamoto and Miyazaki. In addition, preference voting was introduced. Instead of a party name, voters could now write the name of a single PR candidate on the ballot. The vote then counts for the party as well as the candidate; the total number of votes for a party list or its candidates determines the number of PR seats a party receives while the candidate votes determine who takes those seats for the party.

As a result of the party realignments of the 1990s, several two-member districts were represented by two Councillors from the same party before the 2001 election. Some of these Councillors lost the official nomination of their party (e.g. in Niigata), others retired (Hokkaidō, Tochigi). Most of these district split seats between ruling coalition and opposition again, in the case of both incumbents seeking re-election resulting in one of the two losing their seat (Nagano, Shizuoka).

Results

Proportional representation results
The 2001 election was the first to use an open list system (非拘束名簿式) to elect proportional representation seats in the House. Under this system, voters may vote for either a political party or a specific candidate. The proportional seats are distributed among the parties by D'Hondt method according to their overall proportional votes, including candidate votes. The ranking of candidates on each party list is then determined by the candidate votes.

The results for the major parties were as follows (decimals omitted):

 Liberal Democratic Party (Japan) (LDP): 21,114,727 (party: 14,925,437, candidates: 6,189,290), 38.6%, 20 seats
 Democratic Party (DPJ): 8,990,524 (party: 6,082,694, candidates: 2,907,830), 16.4%, 8 seats
 New Komeito (NK): 8,187,804 (party: 1,865,797, candidates: 6,322,007), 15.0%, 8 seats
 Japan Communist Party (JCP): 4,329,210 (party: 4,065,047, candidates: 264,163), 7.9%, 4 seats
 Liberal Party (LP): 4,227,148 (party: 3,642,884, candidates: 584,264), 7.7%, 4 seats
 Social Democratic Party of Japan (SDP): 3,628,635 (party: 2,298,104, candidates: 1,330,531), 6.6%, 3 seats
 Conservative Party of Japan (CP): 1,275,002 (party: 609,382, candidates: 665,620), 2.3%, 1 seat
 Other parties (aggregate): 2.988.442, 5.5%, no seat

The final ranking of PR candidates and their individual vote counts were as follows:

Prefectural races
Elected candidates in bold

Compiled from JANJAN's "The Senkyo" and Ministry of Internal Affairs and Communications official election results.

Notes:
 All incumbents not running for re-election in their prefectural electoral district are counted as retirements even if they ran in the nationwide proportional representation.
 In a multi-member district, there is no difference between Councillors elected with the highest and lower vote shares. Yet, "top tōsen", i.e. being elected with the highest vote, is considered a special achievement and thus noted where changed from the previous election for the same class of Councillors (1995).
 In the results column, independents are counted towards the party they joined in the first Diet session after the election.

Party abbreviations used:
 Ruling coalition
 LDP Liberal Democratic Party
 Kōmeitō "Justice Party"
 CP Conservative Party
 Opposition
 DPJ Democratic Party
 JCP Japanese Communist Party
 SDP Social Democratic Party
 LP Liberal Party
 I Independent
 Minor parties: IA "Independent Assembly", Dainiin Dainiin Club, LL Liberal League, Ishin Ishin Seitō Shinpū, WP Women's Party, NSP New Socialist Party, Kibō "New Party Freedom and Hope"

References
 Mahendra Prakash (2004), Coalition Experience in Japanese Politics: 1993-2003, New Delhi: JNU.

Japan
2001 elections in Japan
House of Councillors (Japan) elections
July 2001 events in Japan
Election and referendum articles with incomplete results